Have You Heard? is the second Dick Morrissey Quartet album. It was recorded July/August 1963 and released on Doug Dobell's 77 Records label.

Track listing 

"Down Home"
"Skatin'"
"The Goblin"
"The Celt"
"Serenata"
"On the Spot"
"There and Back"
"Journey Home"

Personnel 
Dick Morrissey - tenor saxophone
Harry South - piano
Phil Bates - double bass
Jackie Dougan - drums

References

1963 albums
Dick Morrissey albums
77 Records albums